High Point may refer to:

Places

United States

California
 High Point (California), the summit of Palomar Mountain

Florida
 High Point, Hernando County, Florida
 High Point, Palm Beach County, Florida
 High Point (Cocoa, Florida), an area in the town of Cocoa

Georgia
 High Point (Atlanta), a neighborhood on the south side of the city of Atlanta
 High Point, Georgia, an unincorporated community in Walker County

Iowa
 High Point Township, Decatur County, Iowa

Missouri
 High Point, Missouri

New Jersey
 High Point (New Jersey), a prominence on Kittatinny Mountain that is New Jersey's highest elevation.
 High Point Monument, 220-foot high obelisk veterans memorial
 High Point State Park, a 15,000-acre state park in Montague Township, New Jersey

New York
 High Point (Olive, Ulster County, New York)
 High Point (Wawarsing, Ulster County, New York)

North Carolina
High Point, North Carolina
 High Point University, located in the above community

Pennsylvania
 High Point Raceway, a motocross track in Mount Morris

South Carolina
 High Point (Jenkinsville, South Carolina), listed on the NRHP in South Carolina

Washington
 High Point, Seattle, a neighborhood in the Delridge district of West Seattle
 High Point, Washington, an unincorporated community

Other
 High Point Estates, Alberta, Canada
 High Point, Bradford, West Yorkshire, England

Other
 High Point (coffee), a brand of instant decaffeinated coffee
 High Point Brewing Company, a New Jersey microbrewery
 Camp High Point, a summer camp in West Shokan, New York
 High Point High School, Beltsville, Maryland
 High Point Regional High School, Sussex, New Jersey
 High Point Market, a home furnishing industry trade show held biannually in High Point, North Carolina
 USS High Point (PCH-1), a U.S. Navy patrol craft
 High Point Solutions Stadium, the football stadium at Rutgers University in New Brunswick, New Jersey
Hi-Point Firearms

See also
 Lists of highest points
 Highpoint (disambiguation)
 High water mark
 Turning Point (disambiguation)